Deivdy Reis Marques do Nascimento (born 4 July 1988), commonly known as Reis, is a Brazilian footballer.

References

1988 births
Living people
Brazilian footballers
People from Juiz de Fora
Association football forwards
Campeonato Brasileiro Série A players
Campeonato Brasileiro Série B players
Campeonato Brasileiro Série C players
China League One players
Tupi Football Club players
Associação Ferroviária de Esportes players
América Futebol Clube (MG) players
Associação Atlética Ponte Preta players
Cruzeiro Esporte Clube players
Esporte Clube Bahia players
Goiás Esporte Clube players
Clube Náutico Capibaribe players
Oeste Futebol Clube players
Avaí FC players
Marília Atlético Clube players
União Recreativa dos Trabalhadores players
Clube Atlético Juventus players
Qingdao Hainiu F.C. (1990) players
Brazilian expatriate sportspeople in China
Brazilian expatriate sportspeople in Thailand
Expatriate footballers in China
Expatriate footballers in Thailand
Sportspeople from Minas Gerais